The National Cricket Academy is a cricket facility of the BCCI for the purpose of developing young cricketers who have been identified as having the potential to represent the Indian cricket team. It was established in the year 2000 and is located in Chinnaswamy Cricket Stadium, Bengaluru, Karnataka in India. The facility is also used for the rehabilitation of injured players.

The NCA was the brainchild of cricket administrator and former BCCI President Raj Singh Dungarpur.

In 2014, BCCI tied up with both Cricket Australia and the ECB to get experts in for helping draw its new structure. BCCI decided to make these changes along the lines of the state-of-the-art high-performance centres based in Australia and England as part of the revamp of the National Cricket Academy.

In the new plan the NCA has a tie-up with the MRF Pace Foundation to train the fast bowlers from across the country.

Former Indian cricketer VVS Laxman is the current director of the NCA.

Administration

{Copyedit section|date=September 2022} {| border=0 cellpadding=3 cellspacing=1 width=100% |- style="background:#0000ff; color:#ffffff;" ! Season ! Chairman ! Director ! Coaches |- bgcolor="#ddeeff" | 2000 | Raj Singh Dungarpur | Vasu Paranjpe, Roger Binny |- bgcolor="#ddeeff" | 2001 | Sunil Gavaskar | Brijesh Patel | Balwinder Sandhu (Chief coach), K Jayantilal, Roger Binny |- bgcolor="#ddeeff" | 2002 | Sunil Gavaskar | Brijesh Patel | Bittu | |- bgcolor="#ddeeff" | 2003 | Sunil Gavaskar | Brijesh Patel | Chandrakant Pandit, Venkatesh Prasad, Rajesh Kamath, Vaibhav Daga (Physio) |- bgcolor="#ddeeff" | 2004 | Sunil Gavaskar | Brijesh Patel | |- bgcolor="#ddeeff" | 2005 | Sunil Gavaskar | Shivlal Yadav | Dinesh Nanavaty, Venkatesh Prasad, Raghuram Bhat, Sanath Kumar, S. Basu |- bgcolor="#ddeeff" | 2006 | Kapil Dev | Shivlal Yadav | |- bgcolor="#ddeeff" | 2007 | Ravi Shastri | | |- bgcolor="#ddeeff" | 2008-2010 |  | Dav Whatmore | |- bgcolor="#ddeeff" | 2010-12 | Anil Kumble | Sandeep Patil | |- bgcolor="#ddeeff" | 2014- | Anil Kumble | Brijesh Patel | Dr.Kinjal Suratwala (Head, Sports Science & Coach Education), Bharat Arun (Head, Bowling Unit), Dinesh Nanavaty (Head, Batting Unit), V Venkataram (bowling coach), R Sridhar (fielding coach), Nitin Patel (physiotherapist), Ashish Kaushik (physiotherapist), PR Sreenivasa Rao (physiotherapist), Sudarsan VP (Strength and Conditioning Coach), Nagendra Prasad (Strength and Conditioning Coach), Anand Date (Strength and Conditioning Coach), Satish Chimote (assistant coach) |- bgcolor="#ddeeff" |2019- 2021 | |Rahul Dravid |- bgcolor="#ddeeff" |2021- present |  | VVS Laxman |  |

Indian cricketers from NCA

{| border=0 cellpadding=2 cellspacing=1 width=100%
|- style="background:#0000ff; color:#cccccc;" 
! Season
! Players
|- bgcolor="#ddeeff"
| 2012
| International Cricketers: Sridharan Sriram, Shiv Sunder Das, Mohammad Kaif, Gautam Gambhir, Yuvraj Singh, Ramesh Powar, Reetinder Singh Sodhi, Laxmi Ratan Shukla, Ajay Ratra, Murali Karthik, Harbhajan Singh, Sarandeep Singh, Zaheer Khan, Tinu YohananDomestic Cricketers: Nikhil Haldipur, Anshu Jain, Niraj Patel, Mihir Diwakar, Rohit Jelani, Anup Dave, Prashanth Chandra Menon, Salabh Srivastav, Fazal Mohammied, Rakesh Patel Replacements: Manish Sharma, Nikhil Doru and Rakesh Dhruv
|- bgcolor="#ddeeff"
| 2012
2013

| International Cricketers: Gautam Gambhir, Ajay Ratra, L Balaji, Parthiv Patel, Deep DasguptaDomestic Cricketers: Piyush Arya, Vinayak Mane, Y Gnaneswara Rao, Ishan Ganda, Kashinath Khadkikar, Gaganinder Singh, Arindam Das, Arjun Yadav, Vidyut Sivaramakrishnan, Raja Ali, Uday Karkera, Salil Yadav, Mulewa Dharmichand, Swapnil Hazare, Maninder Singh, Shalabh Srivastava
|- bgcolor="#ddeeff"
| 2018
| International Cricketers: Robin Uthappa, Manoj Tiwary, Piyush Chawla, Rohit SharmaDomestic Cricketers: Piyush Arya, Tanmay Srivastava, Salim Pathan, Mahesh Rawat, AG Pradeep, Abhishek Nayar, Gaurav Sharma, Uday Kaul, Pinal Shah, Shahbaz Nadeem, Avinash Vaidya, Shailendra Pandore, Ryan Ninan, Gaurav Dhiman,Tushar Alakh, Abid Nabi, Jagrut Mehta, Umesh Karvi, Sayak Ghosh, Prem Prateek, Sanskar Joshi, Jalaj Saxena.
|- bgcolor="#ddeeff"
|}

Controversies
 Sunil Gavaskar was a member of the NCA committee in 2000 and resigned after criticism from NCA Chairperson Raj Singh Dungarpur on his comments in a newspaper column that it was not correct for NCA trainees to get a tour match at the cost of local teams.
 3 Cricketers in the 2013-14 batch – Yogeshwaran, Murali Kishore and Karn Sharma were released from the academy citing indiscipline.

Border-Gavaskar Scholarship 

NCA awards a scholarship to three promising players to visit Australia's Centre of Excellence in Brisbane.  The scholarship is named after the legendary Australian and Indian captains, Allan Border and Sunil Gavaskar, who both scored more than 10,000 runs in Test cricket.

2000
 Gautam Gambhir
 Mohammad Kaif
 Ankit Kumar
 Anupam Yadav 
Virat Kohli
Mohammad Shami

2001

 Deepak Chougule
 Parthiv Patel
 Vinayak Mane

2002

  Shaurya Prakash Singh 
 Lakshmipathy Balaji 
 Thilak Naidu

2003

 Siddharth Trivedi
  Sanjay Kokane
 Raiphi Gomez

2004

 Shikhar Dhawan 
 Suresh Raina
 Venugopal Rao

2005

  Shaurya Prakash 
 RP Singh 
 Faiz Fazal

2006

 Kshemal Waingankar 
 Gaurav Dhiman 
 Pinal Shah

2007

 DB Ravi Teja
 Cheteshwar Pujara
 Shailendra Pandore

2008

Virat Kohli
 Pradeep Sangwan 
 Tanmay Srivastava

2009

 Kiran N S
 K. L. Rahul 
 Mayank Agarwal

2022

 garv sangvan
 kushal tambe
 Ajit Sharm
 prajesh rajan

New NCA 
BCCI president Sourav Ganguly and secretary Jay Shah led foundation of the new National Cricket Academy facility at Bengaluru. It is being built near airport of Benglore in 40 acres land. It will have three cricket ground, gymnasium, 40 practice pitches, swimming pool, rooms to stay for upcoming players. The foundation got laid by Sourav Ganguly and Shah in an event on 16 February 2022.

References

 
Cricket academies
Cricket administration in India
Sport schools in India
Sport in Bangalore